Gus Young may refer to:

Gus Young (activist) (1909–1969), civil rights leader in Baton Rouge, Louisiana
Gus Young (footballer) (1915–1941), Australian rules footballer
Gus Young (sprinter) (born 1961), Jamaican Olympic sprinter